Court of Justice (Spanish: Juzgado permanente) is a 1953 Spanish crime film directed by Joaquín Luis Romero Marchent and starring Marisa de Leza, José María Rodero and Elvira Quintillá.

Cast
 Antonio Almorós 
 Josep Maria Angelat
 Irene Barroso 
 Rafael Luis Calvo  
 Joan Capri  
 Ramón de Larrocha  
 Marisa de Leza  
 Antonio Díaz del Castillo 
 Juan Fornaguera  
 Fortunato García  
 Marcelino Ibero 
 Luis Induni 
 José Marco  
 Delfín Mateu  
 Juan Monfort  
 Mateo Morell 
 José Ortiz de Zárate  
 Antonio Pares  
 Antonio Picazo  
 Elvira Quintillá  
 Julio Riscal 
 José Rivelles  
 José María Rodero  
 Rafael Romero Marchent  
 José Santamaría

References

Bibliography 
 de España, Rafael. Directory of Spanish and Portuguese film-makers and films. Greenwood Press, 1994.

External links 
 

1953 crime films
Spanish crime films
1953 films
1950s Spanish-language films
Films directed by Joaquín Luis Romero Marchent
Films with screenplays by Joaquín Luis Romero Marchent
Spanish black-and-white films
1950s Spanish films